"Invasion of the Moon Creatures" (also known as "Big Bunny" and "On the Moon with Big Bunny") is an episode of the British comedy television series The Goodies. It was written by The Goodies, with songs and music by Bill Oddie.

Plot
Tim and Bill arrive home and are stunned to discover that the door is locked.  When they knock on the door, Graeme asks them to tell him the password. Then Bill demands that Graeme let them in, and Graeme opens the door.

Tim and Bill are amazed at the change to their office, which has been set up like a space control centre.  Graeme has agreed to do his bit to put Britain into the space race by sending two rabbits (called "Floppsy" and "Spiro") to the moon.  Bill and Tim comment that it would be very expensive to get hold of a rocket to do this, but Graeme says that he was able to buy a second-hand Saturn rocket from NASA, and that the rocket was parked outside.  Tim looks embarrassed and comments that he had just posted a couple of letters in it.  Graeme then demonstrates to Tim and Bill how he trains the rabbits for their space voyage, including giving the rabbits stress and gravity tests.  The rabbits then lift off successfully on their trip to the Moon.

Six months later, Graeme is worried because he had lost contact with "Floppsy" and "Spiro" — and Tim intends to send up two more rabbits to the moon to find out what happened to them and Bill agrees.  But Graeme does not want to sacrifice two more rabbits because they are like family to him so, when the rocket takes off, it is not Graeme's specially trained rabbits which make up the spaceship crew, but Bill and Tim, who are not at all happy, and do not wish to go. After they have taken off, Tim and Bill get into a bit of banter:

Tim: "Look, I just need to nip out to the telephone box."
Bill: "WHAT TELEPHONE BOX"?
Tim: "Er, that one there."

The TARDIS from Doctor Who then flies past.

Graeme says "You're looking good", and Tim then looks at his reflection in a compact mirror and thanks Graeme for what he, Tim, mistakenly assumes is a 'compliment' regarding his appearance.  Bill asks where the food is, and Graeme tells him where to find it. Tim then asks Graeme where the tea is, and Graeme tells him that the tea is above their heads — commenting that they will need to drink the tea through tubes.  Tim objects, saying that he would rather drink tea from a cup, causing Graeme to yell "Don't do that, the weightlessness you fool." Then there is a meteorite shower and Bill opens a window in the rocket to get a better photo. Graeme loses contact briefly, and then says, "Captain's Journal, Stardate: February 18. Time: 10:15. It's all very... 10:15?" After switching on the television to reveal Monty Python's Flying Circus: "Blast. Missed Moira Anderson."

When the rocket eventually lands on the moon it can be seen, from all the American flags planted in the dust, that other people have already been on the moon.  Tim and Bill leave the rocket and set about collecting moon dust and sing "By the Light of the Silvery Earth".  They become aware of all of the lettuces and carrots which are growing in the soil and Tim comments that it must be to feed all the rabbits.  It appeared that "Floppsy" and "Spiro" did not perish after all, and "Floppsy" (who is now called "Big Bunny") comments that he is going to turn Bill and Tim into rabbits using carrots (with Bill and Tim then doing the Bugs Bunny impression of "What's up, Doc"), so that the rabbits can return to Earth and take over the world—with Bill and Tim as the vanguard of the invasion force.

When Tim and Bill return to Earth, they are met by fanfare as the first British astronauts to travel to the moon and safely return.  Everyone is then shocked to find that Tim and Bill have been turned into rabbits.  Tim and Bill then proceed to wreak havoc wherever they go and Graeme has to find a way to stop them.

In the aftermath of havoc, Tim and Bill appear to lose their bunny habits and start craving fish and chips and other kinds of food. They are both still in denial and claim to be sworn servants of Big Bunny. Graeme serves them pies, which Tim and Bill find them delicious. When Tim asks Graeme what they were eating, Graeme reveals that he tricked them into eating rabbit pies (“Oh no! You made us cannibals!”). Big Bunny turns up to convince them to stay loyal to him but Tim and Bill now see him as dinner.

Notes
 Graeme Garden also provides the voice of "Big Bunny".
 The "Moon rock" that the Goodies collected from the Moon refers to rock candy.

References

 "The Complete Goodies" — Robert Ross, B T Batsford, London, 2000
 "The Goodies Rule OK" — Robert Ross, Carlton Books Ltd, Sydney, 2006
 "From Fringe to Flying Circus — 'Celebrating a Unique Generation of Comedy 1960-1980'" — Roger Wilmut, Eyre Methuen Ltd, 1980
 "The Goodies Episode Summaries" — Brett Allender
 "The Goodies — Fact File" — Matthew K. Sharp
 "TV Heaven" — Jim Sangster & Paul Condon, HarperCollinsPublishers, London, 2005

See also
Moon rabbit

External links
 

The Goodies (series 4) episodes
1973 British television episodes